Fateh Singh Ahluvalia (also spelled as Ahluwalia) (b. 1784 – d. 1837) was the ruler of the Kapurthala State between 10 July 1801 – 20 October 1837. He was awarded the  Companion of Order of the Indian Empire.

Fateh Singh was the son of Bagh Singh Ahluwalia, and the grandnephew of Jassa Singh Ahluwalia, leader of the Ahluwalia misl and of the Dal Khalsa, who in 1758 proclaimed the sovereignty of the Sikhs in the Punjab. The Ahluwalia Dynasty was founded by Jassa Singh. Fateh Singh succeeded to the Ahluwalia chiefship in 1801.  He was the chosen companion of Maharaja Ranjit Singh, with whom he, in 1802, exchanged turbans in a permanent bond of brotherhood.

Fateh Singh took part in almost all the early campaigns of Ranjit Singh:

 Kasur (1802-03)
 Malva (1806-08)
 Kangra (1809)
 Haidru (1813)
 Multan (1818)
 Kashmir (1819)
 Mankera (1821).

He held command in the Bhimbar, Rajauri and Bahawalpur expeditions. In 1806, Fateh Singh acted as the plenipotentiary of Ranjit Singh and signed the first Anglo-Sikh treaty with Lord Lake at the time when the Maratha chief, Yashwant Rao Holkar, had sought shelter in the Punjab.

Close association with the ruler of Lahore brought Fateh Singh ample rewards. The Maharaja had bestowed upon him the districts of Dakha, Kot, Jagraon, Talvandi, Naraingarh and Raipur after his Malwa campaigns. He possessed extensive territories on both sides of the Sutlej yielding an annual revenue of 1,76,000 rupees in 1808; in 1836, his territories were estimated to be worth 16,00,000 rupees annually.

The cordiality between the two chiefs was strained by Fateh Singh's direct communications with the British over the question of the Bhirog and Kotla chiefships, the construction by him of a strong citadel at Isru and his constant pleas for British protection. Feeling unsafe at Lahore, Fateh Singh fled across the river in 1825 to his cis-Sutlej territory and sought British protection. Ranjit Singh promptly seized his trans-Sutlej possessions, but showed willingness to forgive him if he returned to Lahore.

The rift between the Ahluwalia chief and the Maharaja of Lahore was, however, soon repaired. Fateh Singh returned to Lahore in 1827, and the Maharaja received him with honour restoring to him all his possessions. Later in his life, Fateh Singh lived at Kapurthala where he died in October 1836.

Gallery

References

Bibliography
 Suri, Sohan Lal, `Umdat-ut-Twarikh. Lahore, 1885-89 

 Bhagat Singh, Maharaja Ranjit Singh and His Times. Delhi, 1990

Maharajas of Kapurthala
1784 births 
1837 deaths
Knights Companion of the Order of the Star of India
Ahluwalia
19th-century Indian monarchs
Indian maharajas